Yvonne Dorsey-Colomb (born August 19, 1952) is an American politician from the state of Louisiana who represented the 14th district in the Louisiana State Senate from 2008 until 2020. A Democrat, she is a former member of the Louisiana House of Representatives, of which she had been chosen Speaker Pro Tempore.

Dorsey-Colomb and her husband, Sterling Colomb, Jr., reside in the capital city of Baton Rouge. Sterling founded the Colomb Foundation to raise awareness of breast cancer. Though John Neely Kennedy, the state treasurer, listed the foundation as not adhering to state laws on disclosing their financial information, a later investigation found the foundation to be in compliance with all state laws.

References

External links

 

Living people
1952 births
Democratic Party Louisiana state senators
Democratic Party members of the Louisiana House of Representatives
African-American state legislators in Louisiana
Politicians from Baton Rouge, Louisiana
Place of birth missing (living people)
21st-century American politicians
21st-century African-American politicians
20th-century African-American people